Mrah Ez Ziyat (Arabic: مراح الزيات ), sometimes spelled Mrah Ez Zaiat, Mrah Ez Zayat or Mrah El Zaiyat is a village in Batroun District, North Governorate, Lebanon. The majority of the town is Maronite, with 139 voters and 135 of them being Maronite.

References

Batroun District
Populated places in the North Governorate
Maronite Christian communities in Lebanon